The 2021–22 Jacksonville State Gamecocks men's basketball team represented Jacksonville State University in the 2021–22 NCAA Division I men's basketball season. The Gamecocks, led by sixth-year head coach Ray Harper, played home games at the Pete Mathews Coliseum in Jacksonville, Alabama. JSU returned to the ASUN Conference, which it had left in 2003 to join the OVC, on July 1, 2021. Although Jacksonville State lost the conference semifinal to Jacksonville, Jacksonville State got the ASUN automatic bid as the conference tournament champion Bellarmine were ineligible for the NCAA tournament due to them undergoing their transition to Division I, with Jacksonville State earning the bid due to them winning the regular season title. They lost in the first round of the NCAA Tournament to Auburn.

Previous season
In a season limited due to the ongoing COVID-19 pandemic, the Gamecocks finished the 2020–21 season 18–9, 13–6 in OVC play to finish in fourth place. They lost in the semifinals of the OVC tournament to Belmont.

Roster

Schedule and results 

|-
!colspan=12 style=| Exhibition

|-
!colspan=12 style=| Non-conference regular season

|-
!colspan=13 style=| ASUN Conference regular season

|-
!colspan=12 style=|  ASUN tournament
|-

|-
!colspan=12 style=|  NCAA tournament

|-

Sources

References

Jacksonville State Gamecocks men's basketball seasons
Jacksonville State Gamecocks
Jacksonville State Gamecocks men's basketball
Jacksonville State Gamecocks men's basketball
Jacksonville State